Daniel Sowatey (born 1 July 1994) is a Ghanaian footballer who current plays for     Vittoriossa Stars  F.C. as a center back.

In 2012, coach Orlando Wellington recruited him to be a member of the Ghana U20 for Eight nation tournament in South Africa.

He signed a contract with the Bulgarian team FC Shumen 1929, before the 2015/16 season.
In August 2016 Daniel Sowatey signed with Xagħra United F.C. for the Gozo Football League First Division and has played a full season with currently having 5 goals in his career there.
MVP of October month, player of the month voted by the federation

References

Living people
Xagħra United F.C. players
1994 births
Expatriate footballers in Thailand
Expatriate footballers in Bulgaria
Ghanaian expatriate footballers
Ghanaian footballers
Association football defenders
Daniel Sowatey
Expatriate footballers in Malta